Alejandro Hales Jamarne (April 23, 1923 – April 7, 2001) was a Chilean lawyer, diplomat and politician. He was a member of the Agrarian Labor Party. He served as the Minister of Agriculture from April 1953 to June 1954. He served as the Chilean Ambassador to Bolivia from 1954 to 1958. He also served as the Minister of Mining from September 1992 to March 1994.

References

1923 births
2001 deaths
Ambassadors of Chile to Bolivia
Ministers of Agriculture of Chile
Christian Democratic Party (Chile) politicians
University of Chile alumni
Chilean Ministers of Mining
20th-century Chilean lawyers